Santa Claus Anonymous, Inc is a registered 501(c)(3) nonprofit organization and a long time, Baltimore City based charity  that provides gift certificates to families in Baltimore City and seven neighboring counties in Maryland during the holiday season. The organization was founded in 1934 by Theodore McKeldin, Baltimore mayor in 1943 and 1963. The organization is one of the few charities in the Baltimore–Washington metropolitan area that relies on the Christmas Spirit of generosity, abundance, and joy to raise money.

History
The organization started out as a Christmas party organized in 1934 by the newly formed Baltimore Junior Association of Commerce to provide holiday gifts to 5,000 children from low-income households; the association was then headed by Theodore McKeldin who later became a mayor of Baltimore. A year later, three additional groups joined the association, the Junior League of Baltimore, Loews Century and the Evening Sun. The group held the biggest Christmas party in Baltimore in the later 1940s and 1950s and the number of gift recipients grew from 5,000 to reach 7,000. In 1947, the organization then known as Christmas Party, Inc. began mailing gifts certificates to a number of parents in low-income households from a list obtained from the Department of Welfare in Baltimore. The idea was that a gift from a parent is appreciated more by the children than a gift received from a stranger. In 1948, the group started an annual dance to benefit their mission. By 1956, the group changed the organization's name from Christmas Party, Inc to Santa Claus Anonymous.

Activities
The organization's major activities include two annual events: a marathon football event and a wine and beer tasting event held during December.

References

External links
 Santa Claus Anonymous

Category
Baltimore

501(c)(3) organizations
Non-profit organizations based in Maryland